Shark Island is a small rocky islet, located  northeast of Prettyklip Point on Saint Thomas in the United States Virgin Islands. Its elevation is 32 feet. It is a colony for numerous species of seabirds, and is also a popular scuba-diving destination in the USVI.

See also
List of islands of the United States Virgin Islands

References 

Uninhabited islands of the United States Virgin Islands
East End, Saint Thomas, U.S. Virgin Islands